Olga Romanoff (1894) is a science fiction novel by the English writer George Griffith, first published as The Syren of the Skies in Pearson's Weekly.

The novel continues (from The Angel of the Revolution) the tale of a worldwide brotherhood of anarchists fighting the world armed with fantastical airships, ending on an apocalyptic note as a comet smashes into the earth.

References

External links

Olga Romanoff available at Project Gutenberg Australia.
 

1894 British novels
1894 science fiction novels
British science fiction novels
Works originally published in Pearson's Magazine
Novels set in Antarctica